Dzuluinicob, or the Province of Dzuluinicob or Ts'ulwinikob, was a Postclassic Mayan state in the Yucatan Peninsula.

Geography

Physical

Political 
The province was divided into a number of fiefdoms or batabilo'ob (sing. batabil; called pueblos de indios or pueblos by the Spanish), each headed by a lord or batab, and consequently (loosely) centred around their residence. Lords, did not hold nor own land, but rather claimed loyalty, provisions, and service of their vassals or fiefs, who in turn owed the same to their lord or batab.

Gerhard claims that “Chactemal was a large uni- fied state ruled by a halach uinic [nachan Kan] who directly controlled the territory between the east shore of lake Bacalar (Bakhalal) and tipú in the south.”93 Both the concept of a unified, controlling state and its extension to include tipu are doubtful. it is possible, however, that many of the commu- nities in this zone, including lamanai, paid some form of tribute to nachan Kan. Gerhard goes on to say that the area was a center for trade along the coast but that there was also probably an overland trade route that linked Chactemal with acalan to the west.94 That lamanai’s inhabitants were in con- tact with communities along the Gulf Coast is strongly suggested by aspects of its ceramic styles and possibly its architecture from late Classic times. We do not know, however, whether contact was rooted in coastal or overland connections, or both.

The Chetumal province, as proposed by roys, includes lamanai and other settlements on the new river (maps 2.1.a, 2.2) ... Jones’s reading of the documents also led him to conclude that tipu was the political center of the province, and that the province comprised the upper Belize river and ex- tended northward as far as the new river lagoon, thus including lamanai.

archaeological evidence supports connections between tipu and lama- nai during the period after establishment of encomiendas, which the records show took place in 1544 (fig. 2.3).

tipu and lamanai were part of a region referred to by Jones as “dzuluini- cob.”57 dzuluinicob was the pre-Columbian name for the new river (map 2.3), and translates as “foreign people.”58 Basing his interpretation on a refer- ence in a document written between 1570 and 1571, Jones sees dzuluinicob as a pre-Columbian provincial entity, and he includes in dzuluinicob the ter- ritory from the sittee river north to the lower new river (map 2.1.d), at the head of which lamanai is situated. Thus, he sees both lamanai and tipu as part of this pre-Columbian province, with tipu serving as its political center in Spanish colonial times.
Based on the archaeological evidence alone, it is difficult to envisage tipu and lamanai as belonging to the same geopolitical pre-Conquest unit, partic- ularly one that was territorially defined. 
Following the arrival of Europeans in the new World in 1492, however, it is possible that the disruption caused by the Spaniards and other Europeans in Central america and central Mexico, and the flight from the coasts generated by the raids of buccaneers and other seafarers in the Caribbean Basin, may have combined to create conditions in which tipu and lamanai, and indeed many Belize communities, were drawn together and became more intimately connected than they had been in the past. Hence, the two communities may have become part of an effectively integrated region following the Uaymil-Chetumal-Belize conquest in 1544. in any case, i retain “dzuluinicob” to refer to a region that subsumes tipu and lamanai in the colonial period, with the caveat that the existence of well- developed, supra-community, pre-Conquest units based on delimited terri- tory is open to question.

History

Pre-Columbian

Classic collapse 

Possible political collapse in Baking Pot and Minanha in circa 810 CE 
Possible political collapse in late 9th cent. at xunantunich / possible political collapse c. 900 CE or early 10th cent. at Caracol / no collapse at Lamanai 

The Belize River valley has traditionally been considered as an area with strong demographic continuity through the Terminal Classic period. This perception, however, may have derived from a poor resolution in chronology. Recent radiocarbon data suggest that the Terminal Classic period witnessed a substantial population decline (Hoggarth et al. 2014). As in the Pasión region and at Copán, Postclassic ceramics such as Augustine Red and Paxcaman Red were probably introduced to the Belize River valley after the period of low population. There were, however, some islands of population concentrations and even growth during the Terminal Classic, such as at Nakum and Xunantunich. 

In southeastern Peten and the adjacent part of Belize as well as in northern Belize, population decline was more gradual, and some areas even showed substantial demographic continuity and vigorous construction activity. Caracol and Ucanal = the dynastic regimes persisted, ... Northeastern Belize, including Pull- trouser Swamp and Lamanai, exhibited even stronger demographic conti- nuity through this period (Graham 2004; Masson and Mock 2004). Lisa LeCount and colleagues (2002) tentatively date the beginning of the Terminal Classic period at Xunantunich around 780 CE. I suspect that this date is affected by some old wood or redeposited carbon, and the beginning date is better placed around 800 CE or some- what later. In addition, new radiocarbon dates from Baking Pot indicate that the Belize River valley experienced a population decline around 800 CE (Hoggarth et al. 2014). In other words, there may be no or little time lag in the introduction of Terminal Classic ceramics, and possibly in the onset of depopulation, between the Pasión region and the central-eastern lowlands [inc Belize]. The population declines in many areas were probably direct outcomes of the political disruption around 810 CE.

Regardless of the specifics, these [classic collapse] studies have shown that collapse dates clus- ter into varying patterns that can be grouped into discrete regions (e.g., Ebert et al. 2014:Figure 3). These can be divided into three broad and discrete “last bastions,” which include the Puuc and central Yucatecan sites to the north, Tonina and its environs to the west, and a large swathe of the eastern central lowlands, spanning from La Muñeca in the north, down to Xutilha in the south (with centre domain = extending out from Tikal in the west and into Belize in the east)

Foreign rule

Self-rule 

Upon the collapse of Mayapan and subsequent disintegration of the multepal, a local batob and their vassals resettled in the province, though these are not known to have subordinated themselves to a halack winik, meaning that political organisation was now limited to batab and his cuchteelob or vassals  see 
Frances V. Scholes and Ralph L. Roys, The Maya Chontal Indians of Acalan- Tixchel: A Contribution to the History and Ethnography of the Yucatan Peninsula (Norman: University of Oklahoma Press, 1968), 67–73;
 Alfonso Villa Rojas,”Los quejaches: tribu olvidada del antiguo Yucatán,” in Estudios etnológicos: Los mayas, ed. Alfonso Villa Rojas (Mexico City: Universidad Nacional Autónoma de México, 1985, 447–63); and 
 Grant D. Jones, Maya Resistance to Spanish Rule: Time and History on a Colonial Frontier (Albuquerque: University of New Mexico, Press, 1989), 98.

Note, at the same time, the Canul lineage of Mayan are known to have splintered, with one group settling in nearby Peten.

By 1526, a vast number of batab or lords had managed to elude vassalage (to a governor), tending to cluster in dzuluinicob, the northwester corner of Cehache, and the Tizimin area

Columbian

Conquest 

Dzuluinicob is commonly thought to have been the last province conquered.
But there were lords who did not desire or else did not accept the role of cuchteel to some overlord. Rather, they remained independent, and their señoríos covered a significant part of Yucatecan territory. This was especially true in the peninsula’s northwest corner. ... independent señoríos also characterized the region of the Dzuluinicob and the Cehache, at the peninsula’s southern base./v Quezada 38

Society

Notes and references

Explanatory footnotes

Short citations

Full citations  

 
 
 
 
 
 
 
 
 
 
 
 
 
 
 
 
 
 
 
 
 
 
 
 
 
 
 
 
 
 
 
 
 

Mayan chiefdoms of the Yucatán Peninsula
Maya civilization
History of the Yucatán Peninsula
History of Belize
Former countries in North America